David Hoadley may refer to:

 David Hoadley (architect) (1774–1839), American architect in Connecticut
 David Hoadley (businessman) (1806–1873), American businessman and executive in the banking and railroad industries
 David K. Hoadley (born 1938), first known storm chaser and founder of Storm Track magazine